Caguas, Puerto Rico, a city and municipality of Puerto Rico located in the Central Mountain Range of Puerto Rico

It may also refer to:
Caguas barrio-pueblo, barrio and the administrative center (seat) of Caguas, a municipality of Puerto Rico

See also
Cagua (disambiguation)
Criollos de Caguas (disambiguation), several sports teams